Elibalta (also Romanized as Elībāltā; also known as ‘Alībāltā and Ālībāltā) is a village in Hulasu Rural District, in the Central District of Shahin Dezh County, West Azerbaijan Province, Iran. At the 2006 census, its population was 244, in 48 families.

References 

Populated places in Shahin Dezh County